Angela Kerek (born 25 January 1972) is a former professional tennis player from Germany. A lawyer by profession, she is now a partner with Morrison & Foerster in Berlin.  

Kerek, who emigrated to Germany from Romania, played professional tennis with the Women's Tennis Association (WTA) for 8 years and German Bundesliga for 11 years. She achieved a career high singles ranking of 149 in the world and was featured in the qualifying draws of all four grand slam tournaments. Her best performance on the WTA Tour was a quarter-final appearance at Auckland in 1993.

ITF finals

Singles (1–2)

Doubles (1–4)

References

External links
 
 

1972 births
Living people
German female tennis players
German women lawyers
21st-century German lawyers
Romanian emigrants to Germany
People associated with Morrison & Foerster